Daniel Joseph O'Keeffe (2 June 1907 – 2 June 1967), known as "Danno", was an Irish Gaelic footballer, regarded by some as the greatest goalkeeper in the history of the sport.

Career
O'Keeffe was born in Fermoy, County Cork, but the family moved to Tralee, County Kerry when he was nine-years-old. His first competitive football was played with a junior team, the Rangers, but when he advanced to senior grade he joined Kerins O'Rahilly's and with them won two County Championship titles. O'Keeffe made his first inter-county appearance on the Kerry junior team that won the All-Ireland Junior Championship in 1930. A year later he was substitute goalkeeper on the Kerry senior team to meet Kildare in the All-Ireland final, however, a few hours before the game he was informed that he would be playing and collected his first winners' medal. O'Keeffe was first-choice goalkeeper for seventeen years in total and claimed a then record of seven All-Ireland Championship titles. His other honours include a record 14 Munster Championship medals and two National League titles. O'Keeffe was also a regular on the Munster team and won three Railway Cup medals, including one as captain of the team. Playing until he was 41 years old, he was posthumously named on the Football Team of the Century and the Football Team of the Millennium.

Personal life and death
O'Keeffe worked for Kerry County Council in Tralee and was eventually promoted to the post of Clerical Officer in charge of the staff on the roads division. He married Mary Moriarty in 1939 and had two children. O'Keeffe died suddenly on 2 June 1967.

Honours
Kerins O'Rahilly's
Kerry Senior Football Championship: 1933, 1939

Kerry
All-Ireland Senior Football Championship: 1931, 1932, 1937, 1939, 1940, 1941, 1946
Munster Senior Football Championship: 1932, 1933, 1934, 1936, 1937, 1938, 1939, 1940, 1941, 1942, 1944, 1946, 1947, 1948
National Football League: 1930–31, 1931–32
All-Ireland Junior Football Championship: 1930
Munster Junior Football Championship: 1930

Munster
Railway Cup: 1931, 1941 (c), 1948

References

1907 births
1967 deaths
Gaelic football goalkeepers
Kerins O'Rahilly's Gaelic footballers
Kerry inter-county Gaelic footballers
Munster inter-provincial Gaelic footballers
Winners of seven All-Ireland medals (Gaelic football)